Plant-for-the-Planet is an organisation that aims to raise awareness amongst children and adults about the issues of climate change and global justice. The Initiative also works to plant trees and considers this to be both a practical and symbolic action in efforts to reduce the effect of climate change. In 2011, it reached a goal of planting a million trees.

The organisation is part of the Partner Circle of the Foundations Platform F20, an international network of foundations and philanthropic organizations.

Origin

The idea for Plant-for-the-Planet was first developed in Germany in 2007 by Felix Finkbeiner, a nine-year-old boy. It was when Finkbeiner's teacher set the assignment to prepare a school report about the issue of climate change, that was first inspired. While conducting his research he came across the story of Wangari Maathai, a Nobel Peace Prize Laureate from Kenya who had worked to plant over 30 million trees across Africa as part of her "Green Belt Movement". At the end of Felix's presentation, he shared the idea that the children of the world could plant 1 million trees in every country on Earth. On 28 March 2007 the first tree was planted at Finkbeiner's school, marking the official launch of Plant-for-the-Planet. Students in Bavaria and across Germany also got involved and continued to plant trees under the initiatives name. A 2020 expose alleges that Felix's father, Frithjof Finkbeiner is the driving force behind the organization, and utilizes the image of the younger son for publicity reasons (see Criticism). Colin Mummert helped spearhead the Munich campaign for Plant for the Planet. After one year, 150,000 trees had been planted, and in 2008 Finkbeiner was able to reach a larger audience after he was elected to the children's board of the United Nations Environment Programme (UNEP) during the International UNEP Children's Conference in Norway.

Development

Since its creation in 2007, the organisation has developed into a worldwide movement. In August 2009, Finkbeiner spoke at the UNEP Tunza Children and Youth Conference in Daejeon, South Korea. There he promoted Plant-for-the-Planet and recruited children all around the world to promise to plant 1 million trees in each of their own countries. Plant-for-the-Planet promotes the view that each tree is a contribution towards environmental and climate protection. It also suggests that each tree planting is an action for social justice. The organisation says that it is most often the developing countries that suffer the most from the effects of climate change, despite the fact that they have most often done the least to cause it. Plant-for-the-Planet says it considers each tree to also be a symbol for climate justice. By the start of 2011, there were children participating in more than 93 countries. As the organisation has  grown, so has its main goal. By 2011, the children had achieved their goal of planting a total of 1 million trees around the world.
Educational networking events known as Global Youth Summits are held for Climate Justice Ambassadors and their youth leaders and supporters, most recently at Jugendherberge Bonn, 20-24 November 2019 and online, 16-18 October 2020 and 22-24 October 2021.

Structure
The organisation's membership is mostly young people, consisting of "members" and "ambassadors"." A member can become an ambassador by attending the Academy, which is a one day conference. As of 2016, members and ambassadors vote online to elect a Global Board, which consists of 14 children (8–14 years old) and 14 youths (15–21 years old). In a second round of voting, two of them are chosen as Global President and Vice-Global President. In addition to the young people, one adult also serves on the board, in a position called the "Planet-for-the-Planet Secretariat". The goal of the Global Board is to give the organisation a focus and make organisation-wide decisions.

Tree planting

Coordinated with the organisation, tree planting activities or "parties" are organised by students and children themselves. The students need to find foresters and environmental organisations to supply seedlings, and show them how, where, and when to plant. The funding needed to plant trees comes from individual and corporate donations. For restoration in Yucatan Peninsula in Mexico, Plant-for-the-Planet promises to plant one tree for every Euro donated. The organization also has a system of independent auditors to guarantee that the correct number of trees have been planted.

In 2018, Plant-for-the-Planet created the platform for Trillion Tree Campaign where restoration organizations showcase their projects and receive funding directly from Plant-for-the-Planet supporters. As of 19 June 2021, 32 million trees have been donated and 167 projects participate globally. To help collect on-site data for forest restoration and to enhance transparency in the platform, Plant-for-the-Planet has created TreeMapper, an open source and free tool for restoration organizations.

Partners

The children of Plant-for-the-Planet do have support from adults: Klaus Töpfer, a former executive director of UNEP and environmental politics expert, is a patron of the organisation. The AVINA Foundation, the Club of Rome and the Global Marshall Plan all offer administrative support to the organisation. Develey, Ernst & Young, Hess Natur and Toyota also provide financial support.

In February 2010, a Plant-for-the-Planet Children's Foundation was established. The function of the foundation is to facilitate cooperation with partners in order to coordinate and support the work and activities of the children. The foundation is also intended to relieve the Global Marshall plan, who were previously acting as secretariat.

Trillion Tree Campaign
After the handover of Billion Tree Campaign by the UNEP, Plant-for-the-Planet increased the goal of the initiative to plant a Trillion Trees. In September 2019, Plant-for-the-Planet released the "Plant-for-the-Planet App" to enable transparency and monitoring to global tree planting efforts. According to the Trillion Tree Campaign website 13.6 Billion trees have been planted as a part of the initiative. In the World Economic Forum 2020 at Davos, the Forum launched an initiative to bring support to plant a Trillion Tree.

Criticism 
In 2019, Die Zeit published an article questioning the published planting figures and the methods used to determine them. Criticism was raised about the mixing of data on trees planted on Plant for the Planet's initiative with those already planted through UN actions before the project was founded, which was handed over by the UN to Plant-for-the-Planet in 2011. The collection of data on plantings without prior control was also criticized. By now, planting entries are supported by geodata.

In 2020, Die Zeit renewed its criticism. Both the tree plantings reported by Plant for the Planet, and their survival rate, were said to be "unlikely " high. " The chosen location of the tree plantings was also criticized, as further plantings at this location would not seem to make much ecological sense.  The transparency of the organization was criticized , whereupon Plant for the Planet published that they will disclose all data, facts and figures transparently in the future.

Felix Finkbeiner explained the criticism on the same day in an open letter as a "complete distortion" that would misrepresent facts and work with assumptions and insinuations.

In 2021, the magazines Zeit and Stern again reported critically. The promises of Plant for the Planet were "too good to be true". The magazines again criticized that the areas selected by the organization were not optimally chosen.

Up until 2018 tree planting activities were certified by the Comisión Nacional Forestal (CONAFOR), the sub-authority of the Mexican Ministry of Environment. Due to Conafor-budget cuts regular visits by the authorities were stopped which was criticized by the authors of the Zeit. Yet, the foundation states that visits by authorities, experts and journalists are possible at any time. The accusation is also made that the organizational structure of the Mexican subsidiary association, to which the donations from Germany are transferred, is "not compatible with German laws". The association consisted only of the two founders, father and son Finkbeiner and a Mexican entrepreneur. The foundation has announced that they have convened an independent group of reforestation experts to review and monitor the work in the planting site and that auditors from PKF would examine the financial records.

Some partners decided to temporarily pause the cooperation until the test certificates and expert opinions are available.

In August 2021, auditing firm PKF issued a statement that read "The results of the audit did not give rise to any objections, and on 30 July 2021 an unconditional audit opinion was issued on the annual reports of Plant For The Planet, A.C. for the 2015 to 2020 reports." Another auditing firm HSL also provided with unconditional audit opinions on the financial statements of Plant-for-the-Planet Foundation in Germany. International Law firms, White & Case and Gibson Dunn also presented their statements that read Plant-for-the-Planet's statues and structure are in compliance with both the Mexican and German laws respectively.

See also
 Billion Tree Campaign
 Global Marshall Plan
 350.org
 Climate Reality Project
 Climate justice
 Climate crisis

References

External links 
official website

Nature conservation organisations based in Europe
Agriculture and the environment
Environmental organisations based in Germany
Non-profit organisations based in Bavaria
Youth organisations based in Germany
2007 establishments in Germany